Jack Blanton may refer to:

Jack S. Blanton (1927–2013), American oil industry executive, civic leader and philanthropist
Jack C.F. Blanton (1921–2002), American politician, businessman, and newspaper editor